Ilirney (Chukchi: , Iḷirňèj, lit. mountain island) is a rural locality (a selo) in Bilibinsky District of Chukotka Autonomous Okrug, Russia, located southeast of Bilibino, on the banks of the Maly Anyuy River. The population of the village as of 2012 is 281, of which 247 are native Chukchi, a slight reduction on the most recent census data:  Municipally, Ilirney is subordinated to Bilibinsky Municipal District and is incorporated as Ilirney Rural Settlement.

Geography
Ilirney is situated 168 km from the district center Bilibino and 510 km from Anadyr. At the site of the village, the Maly Anyuy River is joined by the Nutsekyn tributary, from the Chukchi word, Nutech'yn, meaning "white fat", since there is a band of white clay that looks like fat and was occasionally consumed by the local inhabitants in times of famine. Archeologists discovered neolithic camps on the shore of the lake and about   further upstream is Lake Tytyl where archeologists have also discovered neolithic encampments and where the inhabitants of the village have a permanent fishing co-operative on the shores.

History
In 1945, a weather station was built on the shores of the Lower Ilirney lake, and not long after that a state farm specialising in reindeer herding was established, around which a settlement grew up. However, in 1954, the village was severely flooded and a decision was made to move the village 7 km upriver to prevent this from happening again. In the late 1950s there was a substantial expansion of the village, following the discovery of gold in the area and the subsequent mining developments to extract it. Additionally, the farm's name was changed to 40 Years of October, and it became substantially more profitable as requirements from the expanding mining workforce increased demand significantly.

Demographics
The population of the village as of January 2012 is 281 a reduction of 20 against the 2010 estimate of 301 (of which 247 were indigenous people), though this is higher than the official 2010 census result which recorded a population of 287, of whom 152 were male and 135 female. The 2010 estimate is the same as that made in 2005 as part of the environmental impact study by the Kupol gold project, which recorded a population of 233. In 2005 and 2012 the village was demographically organised thus:

The head of the rural settlement is Vladimir Kumlyu.

Economy and culture
The main occupation of the inhabitants is reindeer herding and fishing and there is a central farm called "poplar" The village has a primary school, a kindergarten, a medical clinic, post office, communications center, a hotel with 20 beds, a cultural center, library, shop and bakery.

In the summer of 2009 on a small hill at the entrance to the village a large Orthodox cross was built and consecrated. An Orthodox chapel is also planned to be constructed.

The village hosts the Kilvey festival (meaning "festival of the first calf") during the calving season, when the reindeer are giving birth to their young. Visitors erect yaranga and the traditional Chukchi tambourine, the Yarar is played while the women prepare traditional food. A bonfire is lit, sacrifices are made and a variety of sporting competitions involving jumping, throwing and wrestling take place. The festival ends with a large communal feast.

Transport
Illirney is not yet connected to any other settlement by permanent road, but a new road, the Anadyr Highway, is planned west to Omsukchan and south east to Anadyr.

There is a small series of roads within the settlement including:

 Улица Лесная (Ulitsa Lesnaya, lit. Forest Street)
 Улица Набережная (Ulitsa Naberezhnaya, lit. Quay Street)
 Улица Центральная (Ulitsa Tsentralnaya, lit. Central Street)
 Улица Школьная (Ulitsa Shkolnaya, lit. School Street)

Climate
Even the short summer period between June and August is cool with temperatures rarely rising above .

See also
List of inhabited localities in Bilibinsky District

References

Notes

Sources
Bema Gold Corporation, Environmental Impact Assessment, Kupol Gold Project, Far East Russia June 2005.
W. K. Dallmann. Indigenous Peoples of the north of the Russian Federation, Map 3.6, Chukotskiy Avtonomyy Okrug. 1997.
 
 
M Strogoff, P-C Brochet, and D. Auzias Petit Futé: Chukotka (2006). "Avant-Garde" Publishing House.

Rural localities in Chukotka Autonomous Okrug